Gemmatimonas phototrophica is an aerobic, anoxygenic and chlorophotoheterotroph bacterium species from the genus of Gemmatimonas.

References

Further reading
 
 
 Qian, Pu; Gardiner, Alastair T.; Šímová, Ivana; Naydenova, Katerina; Croll, Tristan I.; Jackson, Philip J.; Nupur; Kloz, Miroslav; Čubáková, Petra; Kuzma, Marek; Zeng, Yonghui (2022-02-18). "2.4-Å structure of the double-ring Gemmatimonas phototrophica photosystem". Science Advances. 8 (7): eabk3139. doi:10.1126/sciadv.abk3139. ISSN 2375-2548. PMC 8849296. PMID 35171663.

Gemmatimonadota
Bacteria described in 2015